Richmond Park is a parliamentary constituency in the House of Commons of the United Kingdom. Sarah Olney of the Liberal Democrats won the seat at a by-election in 2016 after Zac Goldsmith of the Conservative Party stood down in protest over expansion of Heathrow Airport. Goldsmith stood as an independent at the by-election, but the Conservative nomination was restored to him for the 2017 general election, at which he regained the seat with a slim majority. Olney won the seat from Goldsmith a second time at the 2019 general election.

History
The seat was created in 1997 from Richmond and Barnes, held by Jeremy Hanley of the Conservative Party; and a northern section of Kingston upon Thames, held by his party colleague, former Chancellor of the Exchequer Norman Lamont. Hanley was selected as the Conservative candidate at the first election for the seat, but lost to Jenny Tonge of the Liberal Democrats. The Liberal Democrats retained the seat until 2010, when it was won by the Conservative candidate Zac Goldsmith by over 4,000 votes.  Goldsmith, who blended fiscal conservatism with environmental activism, easily secured re-election in 2015, with a majority of over 23,000.  Meanwhile, the Liberal Democrats haemorrhaged support and fell to their lowest level since 1970 (when the Richmond, Surrey constituency was fought, albeit on different boundaries to Richmond Park).

In October 2016, Goldsmith announced his resignation as an MP in protest against the Conservative government's decision to allow a third runway to be built at Heathrow Airport. Goldsmith stood as an independent in the by-election held on 1 December; he was defeated by Sarah Olney, a Liberal Democrat, despite the Conservatives fielding no candidate. It was the first by-election in the constituency since its creation in 1997.

In April 2017, Goldsmith won the Conservative nomination for the seat and stood in the general election on 8 June, at which Olney sought re-election. Despite Olney gaining the largest increase in vote share between general elections in the country, and Goldsmith one of the largest falls, he regained the seat for the Conservatives with a majority of just 45 votes. Goldsmith's six months out was the shortest time a defeated MP had remained so before regaining the same seat. Olney retook the seat in the 2019 general election, with a majority of nearly 8,000.

Constituency profile
The constituency is an affluent area of south west London, with salaries and proportion of residents holding a degree among the highest in the United Kingdom. The most south westerly stations of the District Line, namely Kew Gardens and Richmond, are located within the constituency.  

The nature of Richmond Park is leafy and suburban in nature, centred around the major settlement of Richmond town, Richmond Park itself and more suburban neighbourhoods such as Barnes, Coombe, East Sheen, Ham, Kew, Mortlake, Petersham also forming part.  

In the 2016 referendum, the estimated local vote to remain in the European Union was 72%. In 2022, 4.2% of Richmond Park residents have been grant non domicile status to avoid paying tax in the UK.

Boundaries

1997–2010: The London Borough of Richmond upon Thames wards of Barnes; East Sheen; Ham and Petersham; Kew; Mortlake; Palewell; Richmond Hill; and Richmond Town, and the Royal Borough of Kingston upon Thames wards of Cambridge; Canbury; Coombe Hill; and Tudor.

2010–present: The London Borough of Richmond upon Thames wards of Barnes; East Sheen; Ham, Petersham and Richmond Riverside; Kew; Mortlake and Barnes Common; North Richmond; and South Richmond, and the Royal Borough of Kingston upon Thames wards of Canbury; Coombe Hill; Coombe Vale; and Tudor.

Richmond Park constituency stretches from Barnes in the north to Kingston upon Thames in the south, and includes the whole of East Sheen, Mortlake, Kew, Richmond, Petersham and Ham. The boundaries also include the Royal Park itself.

From Kingston Railway Bridge the limits clockwise are: the middle of the River Thames north-east to Hammersmith Bridge and then southeast within Barnes to Barn Elms; the outer limit of Putney Common; the houses east of Hallam Road and Dyers Lane;  Upper Richmond Road westwards; the Beverley Brook south to Richmond Park itself; the park walls to Robin Hood Gate on the A3 road; the Beverley Brook south, west across Malden Golf Course; Coombe Road; Coombe Vale both in New Malden; the South West Main Line west of New Malden station; the Kingston branch back to the stated start.
The seat comprises the old Surrey part of Richmond upon Thames (borough), Coombe, Norbiton, and half of Kingston upon Thames.

Fifth Boundary Review
As part of its Fifth Periodic Review of Westminster constituencies, the Boundary Commission made minor changes to re-align the constituency boundaries with the boundaries of the local government wards. This involved moving the entirety of the Beverley ward into Kingston and Surbiton. It had been split between the two constituencies after ward boundaries were changed in 2002. The public consultation on proposed changes across the boroughs of Kingston and Richmond received 11 submissions, of which ten were in support. The new boundaries came into effect at the 2010 general election.

Members of Parliament

Elections

Elections in the 2010s

Elections in the 2000s

Elections in the 1990s

See also
List of parliamentary constituencies in London

Notes

References

External links 
Politics Science Resources (Election results from 1922 onwards)
Electoral Calculus (Election results from 1955 onwards)

1997 establishments in England
Parliamentary constituencies in London
Politics of the London Borough of Richmond upon Thames
Constituencies of the Parliament of the United Kingdom established in 1997